The 1922 U.S. Open was the 26th U.S. Open, held July 14–15 at Skokie Country Club in Glencoe, Illinois, a suburb north of Chicago. Gene Sarazen won the first of his seven major championships, one stroke ahead of runners-up John Black and 20-year-old amateur Bobby Jones.

Walter Hagen, the winner of the British Open three weeks earlier, opened with 68 to take a three-shot lead over Black on Friday morning. In the second round that afternoon, Black shot a 71 to take a two-stroke lead over Bill Mehlhorn, with Hagen and Sarazen another stroke back.

Jones had an even-par 70 in the third round to take a share of the 54-hole lead with Mehlhorn, while Black's 75 left him one behind. The leaders could not contend with Sarazen's brilliant play in the final round, recording a two-putt birdie on the finishing hole for a 68 and 288 total. Black needed to par the final two holes to force a playoff, but his tee shot on 17 went out of bounds and led to a double bogey. Needing an eagle on the par-5 18th to tie, Black's second shot landed  from the pin, but in a greenside bunker. When he failed to hole out from the sand, Sarazen clinched the title.

Sarazen, age 20, became the fourth American-born champion of the U.S. Open, joining John McDermott, Francis Ouimet, and Hagen. He won a second U.S. Open ten years later in 1932.

Course layout

Source:

Past champions in the field 

Source:

Round summaries

First round
Friday, July 14, 1922 (morning)

Source:

Second round
Friday, July 14, 1922 (afternoon)

Source:

Third round
Saturday, July 15, 1922 (morning)

Source:

Final round
Saturday, July 15, 1922 (afternoon)

Source:
(a) denotes amateur

Scorecard
Final round

Cumulative tournament scores, relative to par
Source:

References

External links
USGA Championship Database
USOpen.com - 1922

U.S. Open (golf)
Golf in Illinois
Glencoe, Illinois
U.S. Open
U.S. Open
U.S. Open golf
U.S. Open golf